Law Lok-lam (born 20 October 1948) is a veteran Hong Kong character actor currently under Television Broadcasts Limited (TVB) management. A versatile actor who has acted in many Hong Kong television dramas since the 1970s. He has been in so many dramas that he became internationally known as "the actor that died 5 times in one day or 24 hours" when five dramas he starred in were broadcast on the same day showing him in dying scenes.  Law originally joined TVB in 1976 as a film extra, but left the same year to return to rival station Commercial Television (CTV). Almost a decade with another rival station Asia Television (ATV), he returned to TVB in 1990. He was one of five artistes awarded the "TVB Professional Actor Awards" in 2014 for his many years as a dedicated TVB employee.

Early life
Law was born in the province of Chaozhou, Guangdong, China and immigrated with his family at the age of 14 to Macao. One of his earliest jobs was working at a plastic factory and accompanying the truck drivers during shipment deliveries. After graduating from high school he opened a small traveling agency and also became a tour guide. At the age of 23 he signed up for acting at the Shaw Brothers artists class.

Career
Law Lok-lam started his television career in 1975 with the now defunct station Commercial Television (CTV). Wanting better opportunities he acted for one year as a film extra with Television Broadcasts Limited (TVB) but left after participating in only one drama to return to CTV. After CTV ended operations in 1978, Law signed as an artiste with also the now defunct station Asia Television (ATV), in 1979. In 1990, he left ATV to sign with TVB. With the popularity of TVB dramas locally and overseas, Law became a more recognized television personality.

Law gained international public attention in April 2011 when five TVB dramas he starred in were broadcast on the same day showing all his characters dying. He was dubbed "the actor that died 5 times in one day (or 24 hours)". The dramas that aired were 2011 Grace Under Fire, 2011 Relic of an Emissary, 2006 Face to Fate, 2002 Police Station No. 7 and 2001 Virtues of Harmony.

Personal life
At the age of 21, Law married a distant cousin. They had two daughters. However the marriage didn't last. Lam stated he got married too young and didn't understand what marriage was.

After divorcing his first wife, he met Chan Bo-yee, who was a fellow artiste at CTV. The two met in 1977 while starring together in CTV's production of Dream of the Red Chamber. Chan is also the younger sister of popular 1960's Hong Kong idol Connie Chan. The two married in 1982 and had a daughter named Tisha Law, who is also currently a TVB artiste. Law and Chan officially divorced in 2011 after many years of living in separate quarters at home, but continues to co-habitat at the same home in separate quarters due to the high cost of living in Hong Kong.

In October 2012, his youngest daughter Tisha married 2006 Mr. Hong Kong runner up and fellow current TVB artiste Otto Chan.

Filmography

Television dramas

Television Broadcasts Limited (TVB)

Asia Television (ATV)

Commercial Television (CTV)

References

External links

Living people
TVB actors
20th-century Hong Kong male actors
21st-century Hong Kong male actors
Hong Kong male film actors
1948 births